The Milan Rastislav Stefanik Order is an award given "to recognize eminent contributions to the defence and security of the Czech and Slovak Federative Republic". It was bestowed by the President of the Czech and Slovak Federative Republic. The award is named after Milan Rastislav Stefanik.

List of recipients
 President of the Czech and Slovak Federative Republic - First Class Insignia of the Order
 Colonel Josef Adam - Third Class, 1991
 Lieutenant General Jan Ambrus - Third Class, 1992
 Colonel Zdenek Bachurek - Third Class, 1991
 Brigadier General Josef Balabán - Second Class, 1992
 Major Alfred Bartos - Third Class, 1992
 Colonel Vaclav Beran, M. Sc. - Fourth Class, 1992
 Army General Josef Bily - Second Class, 1992
 Colonel Frantisek Bogataj - Third Class, 1992
 Brigadier General Jozef Brunovsky - Third Class, 1991
 Brigadier General Josef Bursik - Third Class, 1991
 Colonel Vladimir Cupak - Third Class, 1991
 Brigadier General Vojtech Danielovic - Second Class, 1992
 Colonel Karel Drbohlav, M. Sc. - Third Class, 1991
 Brigadier General Stanislav Dvorsky - Third Class, 1991
 Brigadier General František Fajtl - Third Class, 1991
 Army General MVDr. Mikuláš Ferjenčík - Second Class, 1992
 Colonel Josef Flekal - Third Class, 1991
 Captain Jozef Gabčík - Third Class, 1992
 Lieutenant General Ján Golian - Third Class, 1991
 Captain Eva Havejova - Fourth Class, 1992
 Lieutenant Colonel Rudolf Hasek - Third Class, 1992
 Colonel Frantisek Hieke - Stoj - Third Class, 1991
 Colonel Stanislav Hlucka - Third Class, 1991
 Colonel Otakar Hruby - Third Class, 1991
 Brigadier General Otakar Husak, M. Sc. - Second Class, 1992
 Colonel Frantisek Chabera - Third Class, 1991
 Army General Sergej Ingr - Third Class, 1991
 Army General RNDr Karel Janoušek - Second Class, 1992
 Colonel Miroslav Jiroudek - Third Class, 1991
 Colonel Josef Knop - Third Class, 1991
 Lieutenant General Jan Kratochvil - Third Class, 1991
 Brigadier General Jozef M. Kristin - Second Class, 1992
 Brigadier General Rudolf Krzak - Third Class, 1991
 Captain Jan Kubis - Third Class, 1992
 Colonel Otmar Kučera - Third Class, 1992
 Army General Karel Kutlvasr - Second Class, 1992
 Brigadier General Vladislav Kuzel-Znievcan - Third Class, 1992
 Army General Alois Liška - Third Class, 1991
 Colonel Antonin Liska - Third Class, 1991
 Brigadier General Karel Lukas - Third Class, 1992
 Army General Vojtech B. Luza, M. Sc. - Second Class, 1992
 Colonel Jiri Manak - Third Class, 1992
 Colonel Anton Martis - Third Class, 1991
 Brigadier General Josef V. Mašín - Second Class, 1992
 Brigadier General František Moravec - Third Class, 1991
 Lieutenant Colonel Václav Morávek - Second Class, 1992
 Brigadier General Karel Mrazek, M. Sc. - Third Class, 1991
 Colonel Egon Nezbeda, M. Sc. - Third Class, 1991
 Brigadier General Julius Nosko - Second Class, 1992
 Colonel Teodor Obuch, M. Sc. - Fourth Class, 1992
 Major Adolf Opálka - Third Class, 1991
 Colonel Josef Pavelka - Third Class, 1991
 Colonel Bohumil Pelikan - Third Class, 1991
 Brigadier General Rudolf Pernický - Third Class, 1991
 Major General Heliodor Píka - Third Class, 1991
 Colonel Zdeněk Procházka - Third Class, 1991
 Colonel Jan Prokop - Third Class, 1991
 Brigadier General Vladimir Prikryl - Third Class, 1991
 Lieutenant Colonel Pavol Pukancik - Third Class, 1991
 Colonel Stanislav Rajmon - Third Class, 1991
 Captain Prof. M. D. Alexander Rehak, DrSc. - Fourth Class, 1992
 Brigadier General Frantisek Rezabek - Third Class, 1991
 Colonel Tomáš Sedláček - Third Class, 1991
 Colonel chartered economist Karol Schwarz - Third Class, 1992
 Colonel Alois Sitek - Fourth Class, 1992
 Colonel Vladimir Slansky - Third Class, 1991
 Major Oto Smik - Third Class, 1992
 Colonel Josef Stehlik - Third Class, 1991
 Colonel Karel Seda - Third Class, 1991
 Colonel Alois Siska - Third Class, 1991
 Major Antonin Sida - Third Class, 1991
 Milos Uher - Fourth Class, 1992
 Captain Jan Usiak - Fourth Class, 1992
 Brigadier General Alois Vašátko - Third Class, 1992
 Brigadier General Jaroslav Vedral - Sazavsky - Third Class, 1991
 Brigadier General Milos Vesel - Third Class, 1992
 Brigadier General Mirko Vesel - Second Class, 1992
 Lieutenant Colonel Josef Vesely - Third Class, 1991
 Army General Rudolf Viest - Third Class, 1991
 Colonel Josef Vopalecky - Third Class, 1991
 Colonel Otto Wagner - Third Class, 1991
 Brigadier General Frantisek Weber - Third Class, 1991
 Brigadier General Richard Zdrahala - Third Class, 1991
 Brigadier General Viliam Zingor - Third Class, 1991

References

External links
Act detailing the establishment of the order
List of recipients

 
Orders, decorations, and medals of Czechoslovakia
Milan Rastislav Štefánik
Milan Rastislav Štefánik
Awards established in 1991
Awards disestablished in 1992
1991 establishments in Czechoslovakia
1992 disestablishments in Czechoslovakia